William Robert Davis, aka Bill Davis (born May 1949 in Venice, California) is an American illustrator, animation director and designer, graphic designer and painter. He was the creative director at Sierra On-Line and Rocket Science Games during the 1990s. Davis is the founder and creative director of Mother Productions, a graphic design firm which creates animation, motion graphics, logos and other graphic designs for on-air and online purposes.

History 
Davis attended the California Institute of the Arts, where he graduated in 1971 with a BFA degree and high honors.

Davis was a lead graphic designer for NBC and received an Emmy Award for Outstanding Achievement in Graphic Design and Title Sequences for his animated title and segue films on NBC, The First 50 Years: A Closer Look in 1978. He created over 200 "More to Come" on-air slides for The Tonight Show Starring Johnny Carson, and he designed the logo for The Gong Show.

Later, Davis worked as an animation director and designer for Kurtz & Friends, and was vice-president of development and creative director for computer games companies Sierra On-Line and Rocket Science Games.

Personal life 
Davis lives in California with his wife, Betty Tikker Davis.

Games

References

External links 
 
 Billy-Bob's Drive-In Portfolio

1949 births
20th-century American painters
21st-century American painters
21st-century American male artists
American animated film directors
American graphic designers
American illustrators
American male painters
American video game directors
American video game producers
Animators from California
Artists from Los Angeles
Creative directors
Emmy Award winners
Living people
Sierra On-Line employees
Video game artists
20th-century American male artists